Nacaduba is a genus of gossamer-winged butterflies (Lycaenidae). It constitutes many of the species commonly called "lineblues". As they are the genus initially erected to contain all lineblues, they might be considered the "typical" lineblues, as opposed to the species relatives now separated in Catapyrops, Prosotas and Petrelea.

Selected species
 Nacaduba angusta (Druce, 1873) - white lineblue
 Nacaduba berenice (Herrich-Schäffer, 1869) - rounded six-line blue
 Nacaduba berenice leei Hsu, 1990
 Nacaduba beroe (Felder & Felder, 1865) - opaque six-line blue
 Nacaduba beroe asakusa Fruhstorfer, 1916
 Nacaduba biocellata (C. & R. Felder, [1865]) - double-spotted line blue
 Nacaduba calauria (C. Felder, 1860) - dark Ceylon six-line blue
 Nacaduba cyanea (Cramer, [1775]) - tailed green-banded line-blue
 Nacaduba hermus Felder, 1860 - pale four-line blue
 Nacaduba kurava (Moore, 1857) - transparent six-line blue
 Nacaduba kurava therasia Fruhstorfer, 1916
 Nacaduba ollyetti Corbet, 1947 - Woodhouse's Four Lineblue
 Nacaduba pactolus (C. Felder, 1860) - large four-line blue
 Nacaduba pactolus hainani Bethune-Baker, 1914
 Nacaduba pavana (Horsfield, 1828) - small four-line blue
 Nacaduba sanaya Fruhstorfer, 1916 Sulawesi, Philippines, Banggai, Celebes.
Nias,Peninsular Malaya, Langkawi, Singapore, Sumatra, Borneo,Java
 Nacaduba schneideri  (Ribbe, 1899)
 Nacaduba sinhala (Ormiston, 1924) - Ceylon six-line blue

References

External links

 
Butterflies of Australia
Lycaenidae genera